The electoral district of Sydenham is an electoral district of the Victorian Legislative Assembly in Australia. It was created in the redistribution of electoral boundaries in 2013, and came into effect at the 2014 state election.

It largely covers the area of the abolished district of Keilor, covering outer northwestern suburbs of Melbourne. It includes the suburbs of Sydenham, Taylors Hill, Delahey, Taylors Lakes and Hillside.

The abolished district of Keilor was held by Labor MP Natalie Hutchins, who retained the new seat at the 2014 election.

Members

Election results

References

External links
 District profile from the Victorian Electoral Commission

Sydenham, Electoral district of
2014 establishments in Australia
City of Brimbank
City of Melton
Electoral districts and divisions of Greater Melbourne